The Chaco linguistic area is a linguistic area that includes various South American language families and isolates of the Chaco region of South America, in southern Brazil, southeastern Bolivia, Paraguay, Uruguay, and Argentina.

Common Chaco areal features include SVO word order and active-stative verb alignment.

Languages
Campbell and Grondona (2012) list the following languages as part of the Chaco linguistic area.

Mataco–Guaicuru
Matacoan
Guaicuruan
Mascoyan
Zamucoan
Lule–Vilelan
some southern Tupi-Guarani languages (Guarani dialects)

Charruan is sometimes also included. Jorge Suárez includes Charruan with Guaicuruan in a hypothetical Waikuru-Charrúa stock. Morris Swadesh includes Charruan along with Guaicuruan, Matacoan, and Mascoyan within his Macro-Mapuche stock. Both proposals appear to be obsolete.

Jolkesky (2016) suggests that Trumai has lexical similarities with the Macro-Mataguayo-Guaykuru and Tupian language families. These apparent similarities with the Macro-Mataguayo-Guaykuru languages and Tupi-Guarani languages suggest that Trumai had originated in the Paraguay River basin. The Trumai had only arrived in the Upper Xingu basin via the Culuene River during the 19th century (Villas Bôas & Villas Bôas 1970:27).

The following language families of the Argentinian Pampas are also included in some classifications.
Huarpean (Allentiac–Millcayac)
Chonan

Linguistic features
Linguistic features that are characteristic of the Chaco linguistic area include:

gender that not overtly marked on nouns, but is present in demonstratives, depending on the gender of the nouns modified
genitive classifiers for possessed domestic animals
SVO word order
active-stative verb alignment
large set of directional verbal affixes
demonstrative system with rich contrasts including visible vs. not visible
some adjectives as polar negatives
resistance to borrowing foreign words

Macro-Chaco hypothesis

Nikulin (2019) suggests a Macro-Chaco hypothesis linking Jê-Tupí-Cariban (including Karirian and Bororoan) with Mataco-Guaicuruan (possibly including Zamucoan):

Macro-Chaco
Macro-Guaicurú
Matacoan
Guaicurú
(?) Zamuco
Jê-Tupí-Cariban
Macro-Tupian
Tupian
Macro-Jê + Chiquitano
Macro-Cariban
Cariban
Karirí
Boróro

See also
Linguistic areas of the Americas
Mamoré–Guaporé linguistic area
Macro-Warpean languages
Moseten–Chonan languages
Indigenous languages of South America

References

 
Sprachbund